Juan Manuel Bernal Chávez (born December 22, 1967) is a Mexican actor.

Filmography

Films

Television

Awards and nominations

References

External links 

1967 births
Living people
Mexican male film actors
Mexican male telenovela actors
Mexican male television actors
Male actors from Mexico City
Mexican LGBT actors
21st-century Mexican male actors